"Flight Into Terror" is the 10th episode of the second series of Channel 4 sitcom Father Ted and the 16th episode overall.

Synopsis
The three Craggy Island priests are on a plane with a party of other priests and nuns, returning to Ireland from a pilgrimage to a golf course where the Blessed Virgin Mary has appeared. Ted and Dougal share their tacky souvenirs, which include a talking tape dispenser that tells one how much tape they used. As the plane takes off, Ted notes his fear of flying.

Dougal is invited to come to see the cockpit with Father Noel Furlong and Father Fintan Fay, who behaves as a monkey. In the cockpit, Dougal is enticed by the a big red button that says "Do Not Press", and only accidentally presses it when instructed to press the adjacent one when Noel is trying to calm down Fintan. This causes the plane to start dumping fuel. Dougal tells Ted there's a problem with the plane and that it is going to crash, and that there are only two parachutes aboard. Ted talks to the pilot, who agrees they shouldn't tell the other passengers this and take calm steps to resolve the situation. They press the "emergency" button which causes sirens and warnings about the pending crash in the passenger cabin.

Ted takes control, and tells the priests that they should all write a 200-word essay on why they should get one of the two parachutes. As they are all distracted by writing, Jack takes the parachutes, using one for himself and another for a drink cart and jumps out of the plane. As Ted evaluates the essays, the pilot discovers the parachutes are gone. He believes the only way to prevent the crash is for someone to fix the line between the plane's reserve fuel tank and engines, but does not believe there are any repair materials on board. Ted proudly shows the tape dispenser that Dougal got, and with his nerves steadied by the emergency, climbs out of the landing gear opening to tape up the line. The pilot announces that the plane is saved, and the situation is normal, at which point Ted's nerves immediately come back and he realises he is hanging precariously outside the plane by the landing gear.

Later, at the Craggy Island parochial house, there is still no sign of Jack, and Dougal and Mrs Doyle are worried about Ted's condition - he has yet to give up his grip on the landing gear, which has been brought to the house. Elsewhere, Jack is shown hanging from a tree by the parachute traps, the drink cart hanging nearby and just out of Jack's reach. He shouts and wails loudly in frustration as he struggles to reach the alcohol.

Appearances
 
 Pauline McLynn (Mrs. Doyle) is one of the two raucous and unruly nuns who throw paper balls at Ted on the plane.
 Kevin Sharkey makes his second appearance, albeit without any dialogue, as the priest from Donegal.
 Graham Norton makes his second appearance as Father Noel Furlong.
 Graham Linehan, the show's co-writer, makes an appearance as Father Gallagher.
 Lissa Evans, the show's producer, is the voice of the sticky-tape dispenser.
 Liam O'Carroll, plays the blind priest on board the plane.
 Joe Rooney, makes his second appearance, albeit without any dialogue, as Father Damien "Damo" Lennon.

References to other works
 
 The blind priest on the plane is listening to Mr. Bean, which humours the fact that it hardly has any dialogue whatsoever.
 The location "Killybashangel" is mentioned, a reference to the Ireland-based BBC series Ballykissangel.
 Ted says he feels "fearless, like Jeff Bridges in that movie," a reference to the 1993 film Fearless.

External links

1996 British television episodes
Aviation fiction
Father Ted episodes